Cuan may refer to:

Cuan, Seil, a village on the island of Seil, Scotland
Cuan Sound, Scotland
Angel Cuan (born 1989), Panamanian baseball player
Cuan McCarthy (1929–2000), South African cricketer
Cuan Mhuire, Irish rehabilitation organisation
Cúán úa Lothcháin (died 1024), Irish poet
St Cúan (died 752), Irish abbot
St. Cuan's Well, Ireland
St Mo Chua of Balla (died 637), also called Cuan